St Cuthbert's Church, Darlington is a parish church in the Church of England Diocese of Durham in Darlington, County Durham.

History
The church dates from the early 12th century. The church became collegiate when Richard Whitton was appointed by the Bishop of Durham Rt Revd Robert Neville as the first Dean of Darlington in 1439. To support the dean, there were four prebendaries, Cockerton, Newton, Blakwell and Darlington. The college survived until 1550 when it was dissolved.

Following a lightning strike on the spire on 17 July 1750, the crossing tower was rebuilt in 1752.

A major restoration took place in 1864-65 by the architects George Gilbert Scott of London and James Pigott Pritchett of Darlington. The estimated costs of the works were £1,590 and William Vane, 3rd Duke of Cleveland gave £500 towards the restoration.  The work involved removal of the galleries and ceilings, the opening out of the gable windows in the nave and transepts, the rearranging of the pews, and the replacing of several stalls which had been destroyed. The main work was the restoration of the chancel where the piscina and armoury were restored, the sedilia restored to their original depth, the floor laid with encaustic tiles and eleven stained glass windows inserted. A font was presented by R.H. Allan, of grey polished marble. A lectern by Messrs King and Collie of Durham was presented by Miss Topham. The organ was restored and the bells in the tower were recast. The church was reopened for worship on 14 December 1865.

Incumbents

Vicars 1309 - 1436
 Robert de Royeston 1309
 Richard de Hadyngton 1344
 William de Welton 1354
 Robert de Hunmandby 1361
 William Hoton 1398
 William Hesel 1411
 Stephen Austell 1416
 Richard Wytton 1428
 Richard Bicheburn 1436
 Richard Witton

Deans 1439 - 1550
 Richard Witton 1439
 Roland Hardgyll  1451
 Robert Symson  1466
 Ralph Lepton 1497
 Cuthbert Marshall ca. 1548

Vicars 1550 onwards
 Sir John Claxton 1561
 James Thornton, 1571
 John Welshe 1571
 John Woodfall 1584
 Robert Gesford 1601
 Robert Tomlinson 1602
 Isaac Lowden 1606
 Bryan Grant 1612
 Robert Hope 1622
 Thomas Clapperton 1640
 William Parish
 George Bell 1661
 George Thompson 1693
 John Hall 1712
 Cornelius Harrison 1727
 Andrew Wood 1748
 Henry Hemington 1772
 William Gordon 1784
 John William Drage Merest 1831 - 1846
 A.J. Howell 1846 - 1860 
 John Garencieres Pearson 1860 - 1873
 Canon Hodgson 1873 - 1894
 Francis Warren Mortimer 1894  - 1905
 David Walker 1906 - 1919
 Robert Ferry Drury 1919 - 1935
 William C. Jordan 1935 - 1943
 David Brownfield Porter 1943 - 1947 (afterwards Rector of St John's Church, Princes Street, Edinburgh)
 George Holderness 1947 - 1954 (afterwards Bishop of Burnley)
 Peter Wansey 1955 - 1974
 John David Treadgold 1974 - 1981 (afterwards Canon of Windsor)
 Canon Leslie Gready ???? - 1993 (afterwards Dean of Bulawayo, Matabeleland, Zimbabwe)
 Geoff Miller 1996 - 1999 (afterwards Dean of Newcastle) 
 Robert John Williamson 2000 - 2016
 Matthew Paul Firth 2018 - 2020
 James Harvey 2021 -

Organ
The organ dates from 1880 when it was built by Forster and Andrews. Later work by Binns Fitton & Haley and Bishop & Son in 1987 has resulted in a 38 stop 3 manual and pedal organ. The specification can be found on the National Pipe Organ Register. The new organ cost about £1,000 and was opened on 3 November 1880 by William Thomas Best.

Organists
George J. Crossley ca. 1830s - 1850
Frederick Second 1850 - 1858
J.W. Marshall 1858 - 1896 (formerly organist of Richmond Parish Church)
Dr. Thomas Hutchinson 1896 - 1917
Arthur Kitson 1917 - 1941 (formerly deputy organist at Halifax Parish Church)
Edgar Miller 1941 - ???? (formerly organist of Tonbridge, Kent)
Hector C. Parr
Paul Busby 2005 - 2012
David Ratnanayagam

Bells
The tower contains a peal of 8 bells by Gillett & Johnston dating from 1937.

References

Darlington
Darlington
Saint Cuthbert